Göran Waxberg (23 May 1919 – 2007) was a Swedish decathlete who won a bronze medal at the 1946 European Championships. Waxberg was national champion in the decathlon in 1942–45 and in the pentathlon in 1943–45, and held a national pentathlon record.

References

1919 births
2007 deaths
Swedish decathletes
European Athletics Championships medalists